The following is a list of games that have been announced for release or released on the Xbox Series X and Xbox Series S. Both were released on November 10, 2020.

The Xbox Series X and Series S have full backward compatibility with Xbox One games as well as several Xbox 360 and original Xbox games that were supported on the Xbox One, excluding those that used Kinect. Most Xbox One games that also have an Xbox Series X/S version will automatically download the Xbox Series X/S version for the system via Microsoft's "Smart Delivery" program, without an additional purchase. This list excludes backward compatible games.

There are currently  games on this list.

See also 
 List of backward-compatible games for Xbox One and Series X/S

Notes

References 

Xbox Series X S